Dorisa is a genus of parasitic alveolates in the phylum Apicomplexa.

The genus was separated from the genus Dorisiella by Levine in 1908. Dorisiella was created for a parasite infecting a marine polychaete by Ray in 1930. Levine separated off a number of species that while morphologically similar occurred in vertebrates rather that polychaetes.

Life cycle

The species in this genus infect the gastrointestinal wall of vertebrates.

Description

Genus diagnosis is dependent on the oocyst: there is a definite cell wall in this genus whereas in Dorisiella the oocyst wall is membrane like.

Host records

D. harpia -  lesser hairy winged bat (Harpiocephalus harpia lasyurus)

References

Apicomplexa genera